The Crescent City Connection Division (CCCD) is an agency within the Louisiana Department of Transportation and Development.  The purpose of the CCCD is to plan, construct, operate, maintain and police all Mississippi River crossings in Jefferson, Orleans, and St. Bernard Parishes.  Prior to the 1989, the CCCD was known as the Mississippi River Bridge Authority (MRBA) and had control of only the Greater New Orleans Bridge (now the Crescent City Connection). The Crescent City Connection Bridge is the fifth busiest bridge in the nation. More than 33 million vehicles traverse the structure annually.

Currently, the agency is responsible for the Crescent City Connection bridges and three ferries: Jackson Avenue-Gretna Ferry, Canal Street Ferry and Chalmette-Lower Algiers Ferry.

The Canal Street Ferry was purchased on 1960, followed by the purchase of the Jackson Avenue Ferry in 1965.  The CCCD initiated the Chalmette Ferry in 1969.

Police 

The Crescent City Connection Police Department is responsible for all properties run by the CCCD and approximately 14 miles of highway comprising the approaches to the Crescent City Connection; the U.S. Route 90/U.S. Route 90 Business (Westbank Expressway) interchange east to the Broad Street Overpass of Interstate 10 (Pontchartrain Expressway).  The CCCPD also patrol General Degualle Drive, Mardi Gras Boulevard, and Calliope Street; all surface streets providing access to the bridge.

The Crescent City Connection Police Department was authorized by an act of the Louisiana Legislature. Louisiana Revised Statutes 48:1101.1 gives officers with the Crescent City Connection Police Department all other powers of sheriffs of the parishes of Jefferson and St. Bernard and police officers of the city of New Orleans and the cities of Gretna and Westwego as peace officers, in all places and on all premises under the jurisdiction and control of the Crescent City Connection, the Huey P. Long Bridge, the Westbank Expressway, and the ferries and the public ways contiguous thereto.

The Crescent City Connection Police Department has been transferred to Louisiana State Police as part of a restructuring of the bridge police division. The police department's administrative transfer to the Department of Public Safety was effective Monday December 24, 2012. Following the transfer, the New Orleans-based bridge police officers continued wearing their then-current uniforms and using their then-current marked vehicles until midnight Dec. 31, 2012, after which time the officers received new DPS uniforms and vehicles.

All former CCC officers and employees now have positions within the DPS Police and the Louisiana State Police and still perform patrol duties for the Crescent City Connection bridges and the expressways leading to them as part of the Louisiana DPS Police CCC Detail.  Ferry landing patrol duties are now performed by the New Orleans Police Department and the City of Gretna Police Department.

References

External links

State agencies of Louisiana
Transportation in Louisiana